The 1970–71 QMJHL season was the second season in the history of the Quebec Major Junior Hockey League. Ten teams played 62 games each in the schedule. The league dissolves East and West Divisions. The Frank J. Selke Memorial Trophy is first awarded to the most sportsmanlike player, after being the trophy for the West Division champions for the previous season.

The Quebec Remparts repeated as first place in the regular season, and won their second President's Cup, defeating the Shawinigan Bruins in the finals. After the winning the league championship, the Remparts prevailed three games to two in a controversial 1971 Richardson Cup final versus the St. Catharines Black Hawks of the Ontario Hockey Association. The Remparts then won the 1971 Memorial Cup in shortened series by defeating the Edmonton Oil Kings two games to none.

Team changes
 The Laval Saints cease operations.
 East and West divisions are dissolved.

Final standings
Note: GP = Games played; W = Wins; L = Losses; T = Ties; Pts = Points; GF = Goals for; GA = Goals against

complete list of standings.

Scoring leaders
Note: GP = Games played; G = Goals; A = Assists; Pts = Points; PIM = Penalties in minutes

 complete scoring statistics

Playoffs
Guy Lafleur was the leading scorer of the playoffs with 43 points (22 goals, 21 assists).

Quarterfinals
 Quebec Remparts defeated Verdun Maple Leafs 4 games to 0, 1 tie.
 Shawinigan Bruins defeated Saint-Jérôme Alouettes 4 games to 1.
 Trois-Rivières Ducs defeated Sorel Éperviers 4 games to 3.
 Sherbrooke Castors defeated Drummondville Rangers 4 games to 2.
Semifinals
 Quebec Remparts defeated Trois-Rivières Ducs 4 games to 0.
 Shawinigan Bruins defeated Sherbrooke Castors 4 games to 0, 1 tie.
Finals
 Quebec Remparts defeated Shawinigan Bruins 4 games to 1.

All-star teams
First team
 Goalkeeper – Michel Deguise, Sorel Éperviers
 Left defence – Pierre Roy, Quebec Remparts
 Right defence – Richard Campeau, Sorel Éperviers
 Left winger – Jacques Richard, Quebec Remparts
 Centreman – Richard Leduc, Trois-Rivières Ducs
 Right winger – Guy Lafleur, Quebec Remparts
 Coach – Claude Dolbec, Shawinigan Bruins
Second team 
 Goalkeeper – Raynald Belanger, Shawinigan Bruins 
 Left defence – Pierre Archambault, Saint-Jérôme Alouettes
 Right defence – Michel Ruest, Cornwall Royals 
 Left winger – Normand Dube, Sherbrooke Castors
 Centreman – Andre Savard, Quebec Remparts
 Right winger – Yves Bergeron, Shawinigan Bruins 
 Coach – Maurice Filion, Quebec Remparts
 List of First/Second/Rookie team all-stars.

Trophies and awards
Team
President's Cup – Playoff champions, Quebec Remparts
Jean Rougeau Trophy – Regular Season Champions, Quebec Remparts

Player
Jean Béliveau Trophy – Top Scorer, Guy Lafleur, Quebec Remparts
Jacques Plante Memorial Trophy – Best GAA, Raynald Fortier, Quebec Remparts
Michel Bergeron Trophy – Rookie of the Year, Bob Murphy, Cornwall Royals
Frank J. Selke Memorial Trophy – Most sportsmanlike player, Normand Dube, Sherbrooke Castors

See also
1971 Memorial Cup
1971 NHL Entry Draft
1970–71 OHA season
1970–71 WCHL season
George Richardson Memorial Trophy

References
 Official QMJHL Website
 www.hockeydb.com/

Quebec Major Junior Hockey League seasons
QMJHL